Jenő Barcsay (14 January 1900, Katona, Austria-Hungary (today Cătina, Romania) – 2 April 1988, Budapest, Hungary) was a Hungarian painter with Armenian ancestry.

Born in Katona, Hungary in 1900, Barcsay was a descendant of an aristocratic family from Transylvania. In 1919, he went to Budapest to begin his studies in the Fine Art School and graduated in 1924. The summer of 1926 was spent in Makó and Hódmezővásárhely, where he worked on the constructive structural powers in landscapes. In that year, he went to Paris for a year where he discovered the works of Cézanne. His paintings greatly influenced the young artist.

While in Italy in 1927, Barcsay learned about the Quattrocento movement of the early Renaissance, particularly the anatomical studies of the period. He became a resident of Szentendre after many visits and embarked on another fellowship to Paris in 1929 to understand the rules of cubism. He became a teacher at the Municipal Apprentice School from 1931 to 1945 and later became a teacher at the Fine Art School of Budapest from 1945 until his retirement, where he taught figure sketching and anatomy.

Anatomy for the Artist Book Includes detailed drawings of the human body for the fine artist in 142 full page plates. These drawings include bones, muscles, and joints.

References

External links 
 BARCSAY, Jenő - Fine Arts in Hungary

1900 births
1988 deaths
20th-century Hungarian painters
20th-century Hungarian male artists
Hungarian nobility
Hungarian nobility in Transylvania
People from Cluj County
Burials at Kerepesi Cemetery
Academic staff of the Hungarian University of Fine Arts
Hungarian male painters